Oura Health Oy is a Finnish health technology company, known for the Oura Ring (stylized Ōura), a smart ring used to track sleep and physical activity. The company was founded in 2013 by Petteri Lahtela, Kari Kivelä, and Markku Koskela. Harpreet Singh Rai was the CEO from 2018 until 2021, when he was replaced on an interim basis by Michael Chapp. In 2022, Tom Hale was appointed CEO. The company is headquartered in Oulu, Finland, with other locations in Helsinki, Finland, and San Francisco, United States. The company raised its initial US$2.3 million seed funding in 2015 led by Lifeline Ventures, introduced the first-generation ring via Kickstarter in 2016 and launched the ring at the Slush tech conference in 2017.

In 2020, Oura Health received the 'Best Consumer Wellness Company' award from the UCSF Digital Health Awards and Time magazine's "100 Best Inventions of 2020" mentioning especially its COVID-19-related partnership with NBA. Oura announced Series C funding of US$100 million from The Chernin Group, Elysian Park, Temasek, JAZZ Venture Partners and Eisai in May 2021; funding in earlier rounds came from Forerunner Ventures, Square Ventures, MSD Capital (Michael Dell), Marc Benioff, Lifeline Ventures, Metaplanet Holdings, Next Ventures, and private investors.

Products 

The company's main product is the Oura Ring, which collects health data from the wearer's finger like a regular activity bracelet or heart rate monitor. The activity, heart rate, body temperature, respiratory rate and sleep data collected by the ring are transmitted wirelessly via Bluetooth to a smartphone app. Oura launched in 2015 with a Kickstarter campaign for the first-generation ring (which was bulkier than the newer versions). The second and third-generation rings came out in 2018 and 2021, respectively.
The Oura ring is very comfortable and does not disrupt sleep or exercise. 
The operation of the Oura Ring is based on infrared LEDs. The light from the LEDs is reflected through the skin and the changes in the reflection are analysed by an algorithm developed by the company. This allows the heart rate and heart rate variability to be determined. Oura's sensors capture the wearer's biometric data at significantly higher frequency than wearable products from competitors such as Apple Inc. and Fitbit. The device can also measure body temperature and menstrual cycle. The battery is said to last for a week on a single charge. The ring weighs , depending on ring size.

Oura Health announced the third-generation Oura Ring on 26 October 2021, with new features including 24/7 heart rate monitoring, blood oxygen monitoring, and period prediction.

In March 2022, Oura announced that it has sold more than one million rings.

Partnerships 
In May 2022, Oura and fashion brand Gucci launched a ring with details in 18-karat yellow gold. It comes with Oura's Gen3 technology.

Reception

Innovation 
As a start-up, Oura Health has been praised for its innovation in the field of wearable electronics. The smart ring was listed as one of the Time's "100 Best Inventions of 2020" after gaining media attention from it being used by players in the NBA.

Endorsements 
The Oura Ring has been adopted by a number of celebrities such as Jennifer Aniston, Prince Harry and Kim Kardashian, referring to her high sleep scores. It has been reviewed by multiple health technology analysts.

Criticism

Accuracy 
Oura initially received some criticism for the accuracy of their products while being also credited for it. A test on the second-generation ring found that on average their sleep tracking feature was only 58.9% accurate. However, their third-generation ring has shown significantly better accuracy in sleep tracking, making it one of the most accurate wearables.

Oura's workout heart rate measurement during exercise does not match the measurement accuracy of wearable heart rate sensors like the Polar H10. The ring must be very tight on the finger for the Oura Ring to measure workout heart rate. Otherwise, Oura might not show the heart rate information for the exercise, or the results may be incorrect.

Membership fees 
After the release of the third-generation ring, Oura released a US$5.99 monthly membership (with a one-month free trial) for their products that put certain aspects of user data behind a paywall. The release of this membership program received much criticism and anger from Oura users and reviewers who highlighted the expensive cost of the membership on top of the US$299 price of the Oura Ring.

References

External links
 

Finnish companies established in 2013
Technology companies established in 2013
Technology companies of Finland
Finnish brands
Activity trackers